Oltmannsiellopsis is a genus of marine colonial flagellate green algae in the Oltmannsiellopsidaceae family of Chlorophyta.  It was named in reference to the similar genus Oltmannsiella.  It has three species, O. viridis, which forms four-celled colonies, O. unicellularis, which is single celled, and O. geminata, which forms two-celled colonies.  In Japanese it is called .

References

External links

Oltmannsiellopsis at AlgaTerra

Ulvophyceae genera
Oltmannsiellopsidales